Baubliai is a village in Lithuania, specifically in the Akmenė district municipality.

Population 

Baubliai's population has varied drastically throughout the past century, having its peak in 1923 with 98 people and its lowest point being in 1902 with 20 people.

References

Akmenė District Municipality
Villages in Šiauliai County